"Twist and Shout" is a 1961 song written by Phil Medley and Bert Berns (later credited as "Bert Russell"). It was originally recorded by the Top Notes, but it did not become a hit in the record charts until it was reworked by the Isley Brothers in 1962. The song has been covered by several artists, including the Beatles, Salt-N-Pepa, and Chaka Demus & Pliers, who experienced chart success with their versions.

Original version
The Top Notes, an American R&B vocal group, recorded "Twist and Shout" at the Atlantic Studios on February 23, 1961. The session was arranged by Teddy Randazzo and produced by Phil Spector.The Top Notes' Howard "Howie" Guyton provided the lead vocals, with accompaniment by saxophonist King Curtis, guitarist John Pizzarelli, drummer Panama Francis, and backing vocalists the Cookies.

In a song review for AllMusic, Richie Unterberger described the Top Notes recording as "a Latin-tinged raveup with a drab generic R&B melody" that he felt was "not very good". Bert Berns, the song's co-writer, was dissatisfied with the recording and Spector's production. It failed to chart.

The Isley Brothers version

When the Isley Brothers decided to record the song in 1962, Berns (who also used the name Bert Russell) assumed the role of producer. According to Unterberger, the new arrangement infused the tune with more "gospel-fired soul passion": 

"Twist and Shout" became the group's first single to reach the Top 20 on the Billboard Hot 100 singles chart.

Personnel
Lead vocals by Ronald Isley
Background vocals by Rudolph Isley and O'Kelly Isley Jr.

Charts

The Beatles version

The Beatles' rendition of "Twist and Shout" was released on their first UK album Please Please Me, based on the Isley Brothers' version. John Lennon provided the lead vocals and initially felt ashamed of his performance in the song "because I could sing better than that, but now it doesn't bother me. You can hear that I'm just a frantic guy doing his best." A second take was attempted, but Lennon had nothing left, and it was abandoned. The Beatles' version of "Twist and Shout" has been called "the most famous single take in rock history." Mark Lewisohn called it "arguably the most stunning rock and roll vocal and instrumental performance of all time."

The song was released as a single in the US on March 2, 1964, with "There's a Place" as its B-side. It was released by Chicago-based Vee-Jay Records on the Tollie label and reached  2 on Billboard'''s chart on April 4, during the week that the top five places on the chart were all Beatles singles. It was the only million-selling Beatles single in the U.S. that was a cover song, and the only Beatles cover single to reach the top 10 on a national record chart. The song failed to hit No. 1 because the group's own follow-up single "Can't Buy Me Love" held the spot. Cash Box rated the song No. 1 that same week.

In the UK, "Twist and Shout" was released by Parlophone on an eponymous EP with  "Do You Want to Know a Secret", "A Taste of Honey", and "There's a Place" from the Please Please Me (1963) album. Both the EP and album reached No. 1. In Canada, it became the title track to the second album of Beatles material to be issued by Capitol Records of Canada on February 3, 1964.

The song was used as the Beatles' closing number on Sunday Night at the London Palladium in October 1963 and at The Royal Variety Show in November 1963; the Royal Variety performance was included on the Anthology 1 compilation album in 1995. The Beatles performed the song on their Ed Sullivan Show appearance in February 1964, and they continued to play it live until the end of their 1965 American tour. Additionally, they recorded "Twist and Shout" on nine occasions for BBC television and radio broadcasts, the earliest of which was for the Talent Spot radio show on November 27, 1962.

In 1986, Matthew Broderick lip-synced to the Beatles' version of it in the film Ferris Bueller's Day Off. Coincidentally, the Rodney Dangerfield film Back to School (released two days after Ferris) also featured the song, this one sung by Dangerfield himself and patterned after the Beatles' arrangement. The use in the two films helped propel the single up the Billboard Hot 100, where it peaked at No. 23 at the issue date September 27, 1986, giving the group their second chart single of the 1980s (the other being "The Beatles Movie Medley" in 1982).

In November 2010, 47 years after its recording, the Beatles' version of "Twist and Shout" made a debut on the UK Singles Chart. One of a number of Beatles tracks re-entering the chart in the aftermath of their new availability on iTunes, it peaked at No. 48.

Charts

Certifications

Brian Poole and the Tremeloes version

In 1962, Decca Records signed Brian Poole and the Tremeloes, a British group from Dagenham, East London, in preference to the Beatles. Both groups had auditioned on the same day, and it has become legend that the Beatles were rejected by the label. Ironically, Brian Poole and the Tremeloes had no chart success until the beat boom in British rock had surfaced, following the success of the Beatles. This triggered the frenzied signing of most of the popular Liverpool rock groups of that period by the major record labels, and their distinctive "sound" became known as Merseybeat. Brian Poole and the Tremeloes imitated this style, and covered "Twist and Shout" four months after the Beatles had released their version, and achieved the No. 4 position in the UK Singles Chart.

However, according to Brian Poole, "we were doing 'Twist and Shout' on stage before we knew anybody else doing it and we felt we could have a hit with it. Unfortunately, we had it in the can for about a year before Decca decided to release it as a single".

Charts

Salt-N-Pepa version

American hip hop trio Salt-N-Pepa recorded a cover version on their 1988 album A Salt with a Deadly Pepa. It was released as a single and was met with success, reaching the top five in Spain, the Netherlands and the UK, where it reached No. 4, as well as the top 40 in Ireland, Belgium and Germany.

Weekly charts

Year-end charts

Chaka Demus & Pliers version

Jamaican reggae duo Chaka Demus & Pliers, collaborating with Jack Radics and Taxi Gang, recorded "Twist and Shout" for their fourth album, Tease Me (1993). It was released as single on December 6, 1993, and topped the UK Singles Chart for two weeks in January 1994. It was also a top-10 hit in Ireland (No. 9), Flanders (No. 7), the Netherlands (No. 6), Denmark (No. 4), and New Zealand (No. 2).

Critical reception
Rick Anderson from AllMusic felt the song is "a fun novelty". Larry Flick from Billboard wrote, "Who'da thunk this Beatles evergreen would become viable fodder for a reggae reconstruction? It has, and it works far better than you might imagine." He added, "With assistance from Jack Radis and Taxi Gang, Chaka Demus & Pliers playfully skip around a fast and jaunty island groove, darting in and out of familiar lyrics with bits of chatter and toasting. Visionary programmers will find this will flow over playlists like a fresh, cool breeze." Troy J. Augusto from Cash Box declared it as an "infectious cut", that "add peppy new island life to this classic made famous, of course, by The Beatles."

In a review for the Gavin Report, Dave Sholin commented, "Summertime—time to hit the beach and party! And what better for the occasion than this upbeat production that puts a new twist on the Isley Brothers' original and Beatles' cover?" Alan Jones from Music Week deemed it a "fine regga re-reading", that "contains all the usual Chaka Demus & Pliers hallmarks, with sweetly cooed verses alternating with rapped passages. Just right for the party season." James Hamilton from the RM Dance Update described it as a "'La Bamba' based raver's reggae inflected but surprisingly conventional Sly & Robbie revival, a party season smash". Leesa Daniels from Smash Hits gave "Twist and Shout" three out of five, writing, "The'' tune at Christmas parties this year. Chaka and Pliers and a few mates have made a mega mover of a groover."

Charts

Weekly charts

Year-end charts

Certifications

See also
 List of twist songs

Notes

References

1961 songs
1962 singles
1964 singles
1986 singles
1993 singles
Song recordings produced by George Martin
Cashbox number-one singles
UK Singles Chart number-one singles
Music Week number-one dance singles
Number-one singles in Finland
Number-one singles in New Zealand
Songs written by Bert Berns
Songs written by Phil Medley
The Beatles songs
Chaka Demus & Pliers songs
The Isley Brothers songs
The Kingsmen songs
The Mamas and the Papas songs
Salt-N-Pepa songs
The Tremeloes songs
Song recordings produced by Sly & Robbie
Capitol Records singles
Tollie Records singles
Atlantic Records singles
MCA Records singles
Mango Records singles
Twist (dance)
Songs about dancing
Wand Records singles
Music published by MPL Music Publishing
Song recordings produced by Mike Smith (British record producer)